Diego Colombari (born 29 March 1982) is an Italian paralympic cyclist who won a gold medal at the 2020 Summer Paralympics.

References

External links
 Diego Colombari  at Olympic.com

1982 births
Living people
Paralympic cyclists of Italy
Paralympic gold medalists for Italy
Medalists at the 2020 Summer Paralympics
Paralympic medalists in cycling
Cyclists at the 2020 Summer Paralympics
Cyclists from Turin
20th-century Italian people
21st-century Italian people